Utah State Route 123 (SR-123) is a state highway in the U.S. state of Utah. Spanning , it connects the city of East Carbon with US-6 / US-191 in Carbon County.

Route description
It heads east, passing through East Carbon-Sunnyside at the base of the Book Cliffs. It turns to the northeast and terminates shortly after it enters Whitmore Canyon.

History
The road from Sunnyside Junction through Sunnyside to Columbia (now all part of East Carbon-Sunnyside) was added to the state highway system in 1931, initially numbered SR-124 but changed to SR-123 in 1933. The route was shortened in 1935 by moving the eastern terminus back into Sunnyside, and splitting off the portion from Sunnyside to Columbia as SR-124.

Major intersections

References

External links

123
 123